The 1878 Reading by-election was fought on 17 May 1878.  The byelection was fought due to the death of the incumbent Liberal MP, Sir Francis Goldsmid.  It was won by the Liberal candidate George Palmer.

References

1878 elections in the United Kingdom
1878 in England
19th century in Berkshire
Politics of Reading, Berkshire
By-elections to the Parliament of the United Kingdom in Berkshire constituencies